Christopher Scott Plummer (born 12 October 1976) is an English football manager and former professional player. He is currently assistant manager of Scunthorpe United.

Playing career
Plummer played for Queens Park Rangers (QPR), Bristol Rovers, Barnet, Peterborough United, Grays Athletic and Rushden & Diamonds.

Plummer made his QPR début in May 1996 versus Nottingham Forest and played 62 league games and scored two goals before leaving Loftus Road for Barnet in 2003.

In December 2006, he retired aged 30 to work in financial services subsequently working for Tortoise Property in Hampton, Peterborough. He played semi-professional football for Peterborough Northern Star in the United Counties League, until May 2009, when he was announced as the new manager of Northern Star, following Tommy Cooper's move from the dug-out to the board room as he became the club's new Director of Football. He left the club in May 2012.

Coaching career
On 12 September 2012, he was named manager of Corby Town. However, following two poor displays at the start of the 2013–14 season Plummer tendered his resignation at Corby Town. 

In January 2023, Plummer followed manager Jimmy Dean to Scunthorpe United as his assistant manager having held the same role at Peterborough Sports, whom Plummer had previously managed.

References

External links

Profile at UpThePosh! The Peterborough United Database

1976 births
Living people
English footballers
Association football defenders
Queens Park Rangers F.C. players
Bristol Rovers F.C. players
Barnet F.C. players
Peterborough United F.C. players
Grays Athletic F.C. players
Rushden & Diamonds F.C. players
Peterborough Northern Star F.C. players
Corby Town F.C. managers
Peterborough Sports F.C. managers
Premier League players
English Football League players
National League (English football) players
Footballers from Isleworth
English football managers
Scunthorpe United F.C. non-playing staff